This is a list of notable cities, towns, and villages in Senegal organized alphabetically and by region:

Cities
See List of cities in Senegal.

Towns and villages

References

Populated places in Senegal
Senegal
Senegal